The 7th Chess Olympiad, organized by the FIDE and comprising an open and (unofficial) women's tournament, as well as several events designed to promote the game of chess, took place between July 31 and August 14, 1937, in Stockholm, Sweden.

The Women's World Chess Championship also took place during the Olympiad.

Results

Final

{| class="wikitable"
! # !!Country !!Players !! Points
|-
| style="background:gold;"|1 ||  || Reshevsky, Fine, Kashdan, Marshall, Horowitz || 54½
|-
| style="background:silver;"|2 ||  || Lilienthal, Szabó, Steiner E., Havasi, Vajda || 48½
|-
|  style="background:#cc9966;"|3 ||  || Tartakower, Najdorf, Frydman, Appel, Regedziński || 47
|-
| 4 ||  || Piazzini, Bolbochán Jac., Grau, Guimard, Pleci || 47
|-
| 5 ||  || Flohr, Foltys, Zinner, Pelikán, Zíta || 45
|-
| 6 ||  || Euwe, Landau, Prins, van Scheltinga, De Groot || 44
|-
| 7 ||  || Keres, Schmidt, Raud, Türn, Friedemann || 41½
|-
| 8 ||  || Mikėnas, Vaitonis, Vistaneckis, Luckis, Abramavičius || 41½
|-
| 9 ||  || Pirc, Trifunović, Vuković S., Kostić, Bröder || 40
|-
| 10 ||  || Ståhlberg, Lundin, Stoltz, Danielsson, Jonsson || 38½
|-
| 11 ||  || Petrovs, Apšenieks, Mežgailis, Ozols, Endzelīns || 37½
|-
| 12 ||  || Gauffin, Böök, Solin, Salo, Ojanen || 34
|-
| 13 ||  || Thomas, Alexander, Milner-Barry, Golombek, Wheatcroft || 34
|-
| 14 ||  Italy || Castaldi, Riello, Napolitano, Staldi, Rosselli del Turco || 26½
|-
| 15 ||  || Enevoldsen, Sørensen, Poulsen, Larsen, Petersen || 25½
|-
| 16 ||  || Gilfer, Guðmundsson, Ásgeirsson, Möller, Pétursson || 23
|-
| 17 ||  || Dunkelblum, O'Kelly, Baert, Defosse || 22½
|-
| 18 ||  || Herseth, Kavli-Jørgensen, Guldbrandsen, Salbu, Christoffersen || 19½
|-
| 19 ||  || Aitken, Montgomerie, Page, Reid, Pirie || 14
|}

Team results

Individual medals

The prizes for best individual results went to:

 Board 1:  Salo Flohr 12½ / 16 = 78.1%
 Board 2:  Reuben Fine 11½ / 15 = 76.7%
 Board 3:  Isaac Kashdan 14 / 16 = 87.5%
 Board 4:  Gösta Danielsson 14 / 18 = 77.8%
 Reserve:  Al Horowitz 13 / 15 = 86.7%

References

7th Chess Olympiad: Stockholm 1937 OlimpBase

07
Olympiad 07
Chess Olympiad 07
Olympiad 07
Chess Olympiad 07
1930s in Stockholm